Mikkel Bjerg (born 3 November 1998 in Copenhagen) is a Danish cyclist, who currently rides for UCI WorldTeam . Bjerg won the under-23 individual time trial at the UCI Road World Championships in 2017, 2018 and 2019 – becoming the first rider to win multiple under-23 time trial world titles. He is the current (as of 2019) holder of the Danish hour record. In October 2020, he was named in the startlist for the 2020 Giro d'Italia. Bjerg married cyclist Emma Norsgaard in 2021.

Major results

2016
 1st  Time trial, National Junior Road Championships
 1st  Overall Aubel–Thimister–La Gleize
 2nd  Time trial, UCI Junior Road World Championships
 2nd Overall Tour de l'Abitibi
1st Stage 7
2017
 1st  Time trial, UCI Road World Under-23 Championships
 2nd  Time trial, UEC European Under-23 Road Championships
 2nd Time trial, National Under-23 Road Championships
 2nd Duo Normand (with Mathias Norsgaard)
 2nd Chrono des Nations
 3rd Time trial, National Road Championships
 8th GP Viborg
 10th ZLM Tour
2018
 1st  Time trial, UCI Road World Under-23 Championships
 1st Dorpenomloop Rucphen
 1st Stage 4 (TTT) Tour de l'Avenir
 2nd Time trial, National Road Championships
 2nd Chrono des Nations
 2nd Chrono Champenois
 2nd Hafjell GP
2019
 UCI Road World Under-23 Championships
1st  Time trial
8th Road race
 1st  Overall Le Triptyque des Monts et Châteaux
 1st Chrono Champenois
 1st Hafjell GP
 2nd  Time trial, UEC European Under-23 Road Championships
 2nd Time trial, National Under-23 Road Championships
 5th Time trial, National Road Championships
 5th Chrono des Nations
 6th Overall Danmark Rundt
2021
 2nd Time trial, National Road Championships
2022
 4th Time trial, UEC European Road Championships
2023
 5th Grand Prix de Denain

Grand Tour general classification results timeline

References

External links

1998 births
Living people
Danish male cyclists
Cyclists from Copenhagen